Aisa Pyar Kahan  is a 1986 Hindi-language drama film, produced by Pradeep Sharma under the TUTU Films banner and directed by Vijay Sadanah. It stars Jeetendra, Mithun Chakraborty, Jaya Prada,  Padmini Kolhapure  and music composed by Laxmikant–Pyarelal. The film is remake of the Telugu movie Rakta Sambandham (1962), which itself was a remake of the Tamil movie Pasamalar (1961). Pasamalar had already been remade in Hindi as Rakhi (1962).

Plot
Sagar & Pooja are inseparable siblings who dote on each other. Sagar reared Pooja under the light of love and clung to her. He works as a laborer in a factory where he befriends Suraj. Once Suraj rescues Pooja from an accident and they fall in love. After some time, the factory shuts down due to a labor problem. During that plight, Pooja boasts of Sagar's zeal through which he strives hard and acquires the summits in a short span. He buys his same old factory when Suraj approaches him for a job and Sagar facilitates him. Meanwhile, Sagar finds a rich alliance with Pooja namely Deepak Khanna and loves his sister Saritha. At that point, Sagar learns about the love affair of Suraj & Pooja so he performs their wedding. Later, Pooja discovers that Sagar has forsaken his love for her sake. So, she convinces Deepak and merges Sagar with Saritha. All of them happily live under one roof along with Suraj's avaricious sister Kalpana and nephew Kasthuri and Saritha & Pooja conceive. Before long, virago Kalpana creates a rift, as a result, Sagar quits the house. The clock runs, Pooja gives birth to a baby boy and Saritha a girl but she dies. Devastated Sagar leaves the city entrusting his property to Pooja. In tandem, Suraj identifies the misdeeds of Kalpana through Kasthuri and expels her. Years roll by, and Sagar loses his health when understands and returns on the day of Rakhi. In between, unknowingly, he rescues Pooja's kid when he loses his eyesight. Knowing it, Pooja rushes, by the time, Sagar passes away and Pooja follows him showing their love is immortal.

Cast
Jeetendra as Sagar
Mithun Chakraborty as Suraj
Jaya Prada as Saritha
Padmini Kolhapure as Pooja
Vinod Mehra as Deepak Khanna
Asrani as Kasthuri
Jagdeep
Bindu as Kalpana
Manmohan Krishna
Vikas Anand
Gurubachan

Soundtrack

External links
 

1986 films
1980s Hindi-language films
Films scored by Laxmikant–Pyarelal
Hindi remakes of Tamil films
Hindi-language drama films